The Beaver Creek Bridge was a historic bridge located to the east of Perry, Iowa, United States.  The  span carried traffic on M Avenue over Beaver Creek.  The Dallas County Board of Supervisors bought a rainbow arch bridge design from Des Moines engineer James B. Marsh.  They contracted with his son Frank who owned F.E. Marsh & Co. of Jefferson, Iowa to build the bridge for $8,075.  The bridge was listed on the National Register of Historic Places in 1998.  It has subsequently been removed and replaced.

References

Bridges completed in 1916
Bridges in Dallas County, Iowa
Arch bridges in Iowa
Road bridges on the National Register of Historic Places in Iowa
National Register of Historic Places in Dallas County, Iowa